Arcedeckne is a surname of Anglo-Irish origin. Notable people with the surname include:

 Andrew Arcedeckne (1780–1849), British landowner and MP
 Chaloner Arcedeckne ( 1743–1809), English politician
 Robert Arcedekne (died 1768), Jamaican politician
 St John Desmond Arcedeckne-Butler (1896–1959), British Army officer

Surnames of British Isles origin